Kylie Elizabeth Watson, MC is a British Army medic from Northern Ireland. She was awarded the Military Cross on 25 March 2011 in recognition of gallantry in Afghanistan.

Military career
Watson joined the British Army in 2006 and, after basic training and studying battlefield medicine, she joined the Royal Army Medical Corps in September 2007. After her first six-month tour of duty in Basra, Iraq in 2008, she returned to the United Kingdom and qualified as a Class One medic.

In 2010, Watson was on her first tour as a fully qualified battlefield medic, serving alongside 9 Platoon, C Company, 1st Battalion, the Duke of Lancaster's Regiment, based mostly at Checkpoint Azadie in Helmand Province, Afghanistan. While out on patrol Watson undertook the actions for which she was awarded the Military Cross. An Afghan National Army (ANA) soldier, about  ahead of Watson, received two bullet wounds in the pelvis. The soldier, who was in shock, was being tended by a sniper. Watson ran forward under heavy fire to take over but his Afghan comrades tried to stop her because they did not want a woman to treat him. She managed to stem the bleeding and splinted his pelvis. He was then evacuated by Chinook to hospital at Camp Bastion.

On another patrol, Watson put herself in "mortal danger" to attend to a wounded Afghan soldier while under heavy Taliban fire. Another ANA soldier was hit in the chest and had stopped breathing. Watson tried to resuscitate him for 20 minutes but was unable to do so.

The citation for Watson's Military Cross read:

The Military Cross is the third highest award for gallantry in the United Kingdom.

Personal life
Watson was born in Ballymena, County Antrim, Northern Ireland, and is one of five children.

References

Further reading

Female recipients of the Military Cross
British Army personnel of the Iraq War
British Army personnel of the War in Afghanistan (2001–2021)
Royal Army Medical Corps soldiers
People from Ballymena
Women in the British Army
Women in the Iraq War
Living people
Recipients of the Military Cross
Year of birth missing (living people)
Military personnel from County Antrim